
Gdańsk County is a unit of territorial administration and local government (powiat) in Pomeranian Voivodeship, northern Poland. It came into being on January 1, 1999, as a result of the Polish local government reforms passed in 1998. It includes areas to the east and south of the city of Gdańsk, from which the county takes its name, although the city is not part of its territory.

As of 2019 its total population is 117,452, out of which the population of Pruszcz Gdański is 31,135and the rural population is 86,317.

Gdańsk County on a map of the counties of Pomeranian Voivodeship

Gdańsk County is bordered by the city of Gdańsk to the north, Nowy Dwór Gdański County to the east, Malbork County to the south-east, Tczew County and Starogard County to the south, and Kościerzyna County and Kartuzy County to the west.

Administrative division
The county is subdivided into eight gminas (one urban and seven rural). These are listed in the following table, in descending order of population.

References

 
Land counties of Pomeranian Voivodeship